Óengus Bolg, son of Lugaid, son of Mac Nia, son of Mac Con, son (or descendant) of Lugaid Loígde, son of Dáire Doimthech, was a king of the Corcu Loígde, and an ancestor of the Eóganachta "inner circle" through his daughter Aimend, married to Conall Corc. This serves to legitimize the coming rule of the Eóganachta in Munster, still ruled by the powerful Dáirine, of whom the Corcu Loígde are the sovereign royal sept.

The ruling sept of Corcu Loígde during the later Middle Ages, the Uí Builc, took their name from him. They later became known as the O'Driscolls.

Mythology
T. F. O'Rahilly believed Óengus Bolg is unhistorical and simply another emanation of the hypothetical Érainn ancestor deity Bolg. Thus, according to O'Rahilly, he is present to divinely represent the Érainn in a marriage to the Eóganachta.

Notes

References

 Francis John Byrne, Irish Kings and High-Kings. Four Courts Press. 2nd revised edition, 2001.
 Thomas Charles-Edwards, Early Christian Ireland. Cambridge University Press. 2000.
 Vernam Hull, "Conall Corc and the Corco Luigde", in Proceedings of the Modern Languages Association of America 62 (1947): 887-909.
 Vernam Hull, "On Conall Corc and the Corcu Luigde", in Zeitschrift für celtische Philologie 47, Issue 1 (1959): 64-74.
 Paul MacCotter, Medieval Ireland: Territorial, Political and Economic Divisions. Four Courts Press. 2008.
 Michael A. O'Brien (ed.) with intr. by John V. Kelleher, Corpus genealogiarum Hiberniae. DIAS. 1976. / partial digital edition: Donnchadh Ó Corráin (ed.), Genealogies from Rawlinson B 502. University College, Cork: Corpus of Electronic Texts. 1997.
 John O'Donovan (ed.), "The Genealogy of Corca Laidhe", in Miscellany of the Celtic Society. Dublin: Printed for the Celtic Society. 1849. alternative scan
 T. F. O'Rahilly, Early Irish History and Mythology. Dublin Institute for Advanced Studies. 1946.

Irish mythology
4th-century Irish monarchs
4th-century Irish people